Scott Fawell was the Chief of Staff to Republican Illinois Governor George Ryan, who would later be arrested in an investigation entitled Operation Safe Road, which resulted in Ryan being sentenced to more than five years in prison on federal corruption charges that included extortion, money laundering, racketeering, bribery, and tax fraud. 

Fawell himself served time in prison after Ryan's term as governor ended, convicted on federal charges of racketeering and fraud was sentenced to six years and six months.
 
Andrea Coutretsis Prokos, who was Fawell's assistant and girlfriend, pled guilty to perjury and received 4 months in prison in the same case.

References

Illinois Republicans
Living people
Chiefs of staff to United States state governors
Illinois politicians convicted of corruption
Year of birth missing (living people)
People convicted of racketeering
People convicted of fraud